Aldo Antonio Bobadilla Ávalos (born 20 April 1976) is a Paraguayan retired footballer who played as a goalkeeper. He was most recently manager of Independiente Medellín and Paraguay's U-20 team.

Career

Club

Bobadilla started his career at Paraguayan club Cerro Porteño already in the junior league, he was trained by Modesto Sandoval that is how he got the skills to play in the pro team some years later, then moved to Gimnasia y Esgrima de La Plata of Argentina. He returned to Paraguay to play for Club Libertad until mid-2006, when he signed for Argentine Boca Juniors.

Though he started the last season as the first-choice goalkeeper for Boca Juniors, he lost his place to Caranta after his rival's good performances in friendly matches.

In early September 2007 he signed a contract with Colombian side Independiente Medellín helping the team overcome the problem they had in the previous season by being the team with the most goals scored against.

Early in 2011, Bobadilla signed a two-year contract with Club Olimpia of Asunción. After Olimpia finishing in second place during that year's Apertura Tournament, Bobadilla decided to end his career, starting to take Manegerial jobs with Paraguayan lower-ranking teams.

International career
Bobadilla was part of the Paraguay national football team that competed in the 2006 FIFA World Cup. He went as a substitute and was not expected to play. However, Bobadilla had to replace starting goalkeeper Justo Villar after Villar's injury in the first match, against England.

Honours
Cerro Porteño
Paraguayan Primera División (2): 2001, 2004
Libertad
Paraguayan Primera División (1): 2006
Boca Juniors
Recopa Sudamericana (1): 2006
Copa Libertadores (1): 2007
Independiente Medellín
Categoría Primera A (1): 2009 Finalización

References

External links

Aldo Bobadilla at Footballdatabase

1976 births
Living people
Paraguayan footballers
Paraguayan expatriate footballers
Cerro Porteño players
Club de Gimnasia y Esgrima La Plata footballers
Club Libertad footballers
Club Olimpia footballers
Boca Juniors footballers
Independiente Medellín footballers
Sport Club Corinthians Paulista players
Argentine Primera División players
Categoría Primera A players
Paraguayan Primera División players
Association football goalkeepers
Paraguay international footballers
2007 Copa América players
2006 FIFA World Cup players
2010 FIFA World Cup players
Expatriate footballers in Argentina
Expatriate footballers in Brazil
Expatriate footballers in Colombia
Paraguayan football managers
Club Olimpia managers
Club Libertad managers
Club Nacional managers
Independiente Medellín managers
Sportivo Trinidense managers
Club General Díaz (Luque) managers